The Chukotka constituency (No. 224) is a Russian legislative constituency in the Chukotka Autonomous Okrug. The constituency is the only one in Chukotka, and occupies the whole of its territory. It is also the smallest single-member constituency of the State Duma by population.

Population of Chukotka constituency is about 50,000.

Members elected

Election results

1993

|-
! colspan=2 style="background-color:#E9E9E9;text-align:left;vertical-align:top;" |Candidate
! style="background-color:#E9E9E9;text-align:left;vertical-align:top;" |Party
! style="background-color:#E9E9E9;text-align:right;" |Votes
! style="background-color:#E9E9E9;text-align:right;" |%
|-
|style="background-color: " |
|align=left|Tatyana Nesterenko
|align=left|Independent
|10,812
|25.50%
|-
|style="background-color: "|
|align=left|Yekaterina Nutanaun
|align=left|Independent
| -
|14.87%
|-
| colspan="5" style="background-color:#E9E9E9;"|
|- style="font-weight:bold"
| colspan="3" style="text-align:left;" | Total
| 42,404
| 100%
|-
| colspan="5" style="background-color:#E9E9E9;"|
|- style="font-weight:bold"
| colspan="4" |Source:
|
|}

1995

|-
! colspan=2 style="background-color:#E9E9E9;text-align:left;vertical-align:top;" |Candidate
! style="background-color:#E9E9E9;text-align:left;vertical-align:top;" |Party
! style="background-color:#E9E9E9;text-align:right;" |Votes
! style="background-color:#E9E9E9;text-align:right;" |%
|-
|style="background-color: "|
|align=left|Tatyana Nesterenko (incumbent)
|align=left|Independent
|17,005
|42.17%
|-
|style="background-color: " |
|align=left|Maya Ettyryntyna
|align=left|Communist Party
|9,204
|22.83%
|-
|style="background-color: " |
|align=left|Viktor Filatov
|align=left|Liberal Democratic Party
|2,860
|7.09%
|-
|style="background-color:#F7C451"|
|align=left|Larisa Abryutina
|align=left|Common Cause
|1,638
|4.06%
|-
|style="background-color: "|
|align=left|Vladimir Yetylin
|align=left|Independent
|1,495
|3.71%
|-
|style="background-color: "|
|align=left|Dmitry Ledovskoy
|align=left|Independent
|1,201
|2.98%
|-
|style="background-color:#3A46CE"|
|align=left|Igor Riga
|align=left|Democratic Choice of Russia – United Democrats
|986
|2.45%
|-
|style="background-color: " |
|align=left|Ilsur Idiatov
|align=left|Independent
|721
|1.79%
|-
|style="background-color: white" |
|align=left|Vladimir Voblikov
|align=left|Faith, Work, Conscience
|428
|1.07%
|-
|style="background-color: " |
|align=left|Aleksandr Volkov
|align=left|Independent
|417
|1.03%
|-
|style="background-color:#000000"|
|colspan=2 |against all
|3,989
|9.89%
|-
| colspan="5" style="background-color:#E9E9E9;"|
|- style="font-weight:bold"
| colspan="3" style="text-align:left;" | Total
| 40,323
| 100%
|-
| colspan="5" style="background-color:#E9E9E9;"|
|- style="font-weight:bold"
| colspan="4" |Source:
|
|}

1998

|-
! colspan=2 style="background-color:#E9E9E9;text-align:left;vertical-align:top;" |Candidate
! style="background-color:#E9E9E9;text-align:left;vertical-align:top;" |Party
! style="background-color:#E9E9E9;text-align:right;" |Votes
! style="background-color:#E9E9E9;text-align:right;" |%
|-
|style="background-color: "|
|align=left|Vladimir Babichev
|align=left|Independent
|14,405
|57.88%
|-
| colspan="5" style="background-color:#E9E9E9;"|
|- style="font-weight:bold"
| colspan="3" style="text-align:left;" | Total
| 24,888
| 100%
|-
| colspan="5" style="background-color:#E9E9E9;"|
|- style="font-weight:bold"
| colspan="4" |Source:
|
|}

1999

|-
! colspan=2 style="background-color:#E9E9E9;text-align:left;vertical-align:top;" |Candidate
! style="background-color:#E9E9E9;text-align:left;vertical-align:top;" |Party
! style="background-color:#E9E9E9;text-align:right;" |Votes
! style="background-color:#E9E9E9;text-align:right;" |%
|-
|style="background-color: "|
|align=left|Roman Abramovich
|align=left|Independent
|18,138
|59.78%
|-
|style="background-color: "|
|align=left|Vladimir Yetylin
|align=left|Independent
|6,071
|20.01%
|-
|style="background-color: "|
|align=left|Aleksandr Kiselyov
|align=left|Independent
|1,590
|5.24%
|-
|style="background-color:#000000"|
|colspan=2 |against all
|3,983
|13.13%
|-
| colspan="5" style="background-color:#E9E9E9;"|
|- style="font-weight:bold"
| colspan="3" style="text-align:left;" | Total
| 30,339
| 100%
|-
| colspan="5" style="background-color:#E9E9E9;"|
|- style="font-weight:bold"
| colspan="4" |Source:
|
|}

2001

|-
! colspan=2 style="background-color:#E9E9E9;text-align:left;vertical-align:top;" |Candidate
! style="background-color:#E9E9E9;text-align:left;vertical-align:top;" |Party
! style="background-color:#E9E9E9;text-align:right;" |Votes
! style="background-color:#E9E9E9;text-align:right;" |%
|-
|style="background-color: "|
|align=left|Vladimir Yetylin
|align=left|Independent
|4,534
|25.88%
|-
|style="background-color: "|
|align=left|Boris Vetoshev
|align=left|Independent
|3,873
|22.11%
|-
|style="background-color: "|
|align=left|Larisa Abryutina
|align=left|Independent
|3,169
|18.09%
|-
|style="background-color: "|
|align=left|Nikolay Zheleznov
|align=left|Independent
|952
|5.43%
|-
|style="background-color: "|
|align=left|Vladimir Dmitrik
|align=left|Independent
|596
|3.40%
|-
|style="background-color: "|
|align=left|Aleksandr Melnikov
|align=left|Independent
|433
|2.47%
|-
|style="background-color:#000000"|
|colspan=2 |against all
|3,557
|20.30%
|-
| colspan="5" style="background-color:#E9E9E9;"|
|- style="font-weight:bold"
| colspan="3" style="text-align:left;" | Total
| 17,519
| 100%
|-
| colspan="5" style="background-color:#E9E9E9;"|
|- style="font-weight:bold"
| colspan="4" |Source:
|
|}

2003

|-
! colspan=2 style="background-color:#E9E9E9;text-align:left;vertical-align:top;" |Candidate
! style="background-color:#E9E9E9;text-align:left;vertical-align:top;" |Party
! style="background-color:#E9E9E9;text-align:right;" |Votes
! style="background-color:#E9E9E9;text-align:right;" |%
|-
|style="background-color: "|
|align=left|Irina Panchenko
|align=left|Independent
|19,222
|79.17%
|-
|style="background-color: "|
|align=left|Aleksandr Rudoy
|align=left|Independent
|1,188
|4.89%
|-
|style="background-color: "|
|align=left|Eduard Petrenko
|align=left|Independent
|915
|3.77%
|-
|style="background-color:#000000"|
|colspan=2 |against all
|2,133
|8.79%
|-
| colspan="5" style="background-color:#E9E9E9;"|
|- style="font-weight:bold"
| colspan="3" style="text-align:left;" | Total
| 24,280
| 100%
|-
| colspan="5" style="background-color:#E9E9E9;"|
|- style="font-weight:bold"
| colspan="4" |Source:
|
|}

2016

|-
! colspan=2 style="background-color:#E9E9E9;text-align:left;vertical-align:top;" |Candidate
! style="background-color:#E9E9E9;text-align:left;vertical-align:top;" |Party
! style="background-color:#E9E9E9;text-align:right;" |Votes
! style="background-color:#E9E9E9;text-align:right;" |%
|-
|style="background-color: " |
|align=left|Valentina Rudchenko
|align=left|United Russia
|10,435
|56.54%
|-
|style="background-color: " |
|align=left|Yulia Butakova
|align=left|Liberal Democratic Party
|3,214
|17.42%
|-
|style="background-color: " |
|align=left|Vladimir Galtsov
|align=left|Communist Party
|1,631
|8.84%
|-
|style="background-color: " |
|align=left|Yelena Polovodova
|align=left|A Just Russia
|1,126
|6.10%
|-
|style="background: #E62020;"| 
|align=left|Viktor Kolpakov
|align=left|Communists of Russia
|820
|4.44%
|-
| colspan="5" style="background-color:#E9E9E9;"|
|- style="font-weight:bold"
| colspan="3" style="text-align:left;" | Total
| 17,226
| 100%
|-
| colspan="5" style="background-color:#E9E9E9;"|
|- style="font-weight:bold"
| colspan="4" |Source:
|
|}

2021

|-
! colspan=2 style="background-color:#E9E9E9;text-align:left;vertical-align:top;" |Candidate
! style="background-color:#E9E9E9;text-align:left;vertical-align:top;" |Party
! style="background-color:#E9E9E9;text-align:right;" |Votes
! style="background-color:#E9E9E9;text-align:right;" |%
|-
|style="background-color: " |
|align=left|Yelena Yevtyukhova
|align=left|United Russia
|6,156
|36.95%
|-
|style="background-color: " |
|align=left|Yulia Butakova
|align=left|Liberal Democratic Party
|3,310
|19.87%
|-
|style="background-color: " |
|align=left|Vladimir Galtsov
|align=left|Communist Party
|2,550
|15.31%
|-
|style="background-color: " |
|align=left|Maria Yefimova
|align=left|Party of Pensioners
|1,593
|9.56%
|-
|style="background-color: " |
|align=left|Aleksandr Semerikov
|align=left|A Just Russia — For Truth
|1,585
|9.51%
|-
| colspan="5" style="background-color:#E9E9E9;"|
|- style="font-weight:bold"
| colspan="3" style="text-align:left;" | Total
| 16,659
| 100%
|-
| colspan="5" style="background-color:#E9E9E9;"|
|- style="font-weight:bold"
| colspan="4" |Source:
|
|}

Notes

Sources
224. Чукотский одномандатный избирательный округ

References

Russian legislative constituencies
Politics of Chukotka Autonomous Okrug